Medicine Butte is a mountain located in Uinta County, approximately  north of the city of Evanston, Wyoming. The mountain houses radio towers serving numerous local and regional services.

The mountain is named as such by Native Americans because of the great variety of herbs and roots that they used for medicine which were found on the slopes of the butte. The mountain is sometimes known as "Fremont’s Monument" for John C. Fremont.

Radio use

Radio towers for several different communications systems exist on the summit of the mountain. Most notable of these are two higher power FM radio stations, and numerous translators serving the local area.
The following is a complete list of radio stations with transmitters located on the mountain, sorted by frequency:

As well as housing towers and transmitters for radio stations, the mountain also has towers for amateur radio operations. It is owned by a resident from Manila, Utah and transmits on 146.680 MHz. Another amateur radio repeater nearby, transmits on 147.02 MHz. It is known as K70GM. Local companies and telecommunications services also carry towers on the mountain. Emergency systems for Evanston and Uinta County also broadcast from towers on Medicine Butte. Daggett County, Utah also has services transmitting from the mountain. The United States Forest Service owns a tower on the mountain.

KNYN

KNYN is the highest power radio station transmitting on the mountain. In 2005, the station suffered a partial tower collapse and has been running on lower power (and a backup transmitter) since. The cause of the collapse was apparently weather-related, as the area had experienced heavy icing.

Television
Medicine Butte is commonly used to receive television signals from the Salt Lake City market, and relay them into rural parts of Wyoming and Idaho. The following is a complete list of television stations broadcasting from Medicine Butte to the surrounding area.

Access
Medicine Butte can be accessed via Red Willow Road, north of Evanston on US Highway 89. The road is used locally for the landfill of Evanston, but branches off to the left to climb the summit. The road is not in good condition in most places, and a four-wheel drive vehicle is recommended.

References

Mountains of Wyoming
Mountains of Uinta County, Wyoming